Proteodes is a genus of moths in the family Depressariidae. It was first described by Edward Meyrick in 1883. This genus is endemic to New Zealand.

Species 
Species in this genus are:

 Proteodes carnifex (Butler, 1877)
 Proteodes clarkei Philpott, 1926
 Proteodes melographa Meyrick, 1927
 Proteodes profunda Meyrick, 1905
 Proteodes smithi  Howes, 1946

References 

Depressariidae
Endemic fauna of New Zealand
Endemic moths of New Zealand